Rock Hill Galleria is an enclosed regional shopping mall for York, Chester, and Lancaster Counties. It is located in Rock Hill, South Carolina. Opened in 1991, the mall features three  anchors (Belk, Walmart, Dick's) and around 70 specialty shops there are only 29 stores inside the mall currently and most stores have been closed down since there is hardly any business inside this mall or the stores that closed down have gone out of business. The mall is currently managed by Warren Norman Company.

History
The mall opened for business on May 16, 1991. Zamias Services, Inc. developed the property. Three of the anchor stores (Belk, JCPenney and Sears) moved from an existing mall called Rock Hill Mall, which closed in the early 1990s and later demolished in 2008, after losing those stores; the other anchors at the Galleria included Phar-Mor and Walmart. The former closed after only one year in business, and was replaced with a Brendle's catalog showroom in October 1995, but the store closed after only six months in business following the chain's filing for Chapter 11 bankruptcy.

The Phar-Mor/Brendle's space remained vacant until 2004, when it was replaced by Steve & Barry's. Goody's was added as an anchor in 1998, having been delayed from an initial opening date of November 1997. These stores closed in 2008 and 2009, respectively, following the respective bankruptcy of each chain. In 2013, the Belk store was renovated, while the JCPenney store was doubled in size.

In 2014, the former Goody's became Home South Furniture, while Revolutions, a bowling alley and bar, opened in the former Phar-Mor/Steve & Barry's space.

On November 8, 2018, it was announced that Sears will be closing this location in early 2019 as part of a plan to close 40 stores.
Revolutions and Home South both closed early 2019.

On June 4, 2020, JCPenney announced that this location would close as part of a plan to close 154 stores nationwide which will leave Belk and Walmart as the only anchors left.

References

External links
 Rock Hill Galleria Official Website

Shopping malls in South Carolina
Buildings and structures in Rock Hill, South Carolina
Shopping malls established in 1991
Tourist attractions in York County, South Carolina
1991 establishments in South Carolina